Mauro Demian Luque (born 27 May 1999) is an Argentine professional footballer who plays as a right-back for Defensores de Belgrano, on loan from Racing Club.

Career
After stints with local sides Club Liverpool and Deportivo Ñapindá, Luque departed to Racing Club in 2017. After three years in their academy, Luque was promoted into the first-team under manager Sebastián Beccacece in 2020. He was selected on the substitute's bench for a Copa de la Liga Profesional encounter with Unión Santa Fe on 28 November, with the right-back soon entering in place of Walter Montoya with five minutes remaining to make his senior debut in a 1–0 home win. 

In February 2021, Luque moved to Atlanta on a one-year loan deal. Ahead of the 2022 season, Luque was loaned out again, this time to Defensores de Belgrano until the end of 2022.

Career statistics
.

Notes

References

External links

1999 births
Living people
Sportspeople from Entre Ríos Province
Argentine footballers
Association football defenders
Argentine Primera División players
Primera Nacional players
Racing Club de Avellaneda footballers
Club Atlético Atlanta footballers
Defensores de Belgrano footballers